Bruce Edward Caldwell (born July 8, 1947) is an American prelate of the Episcopal Church served as Bishop of Wyoming from 1997 to 2010.

Early life and education
Caldwell was born on July 8, 1947, in Painesville, Ohio, the son of the Reverend Robert M. Caldwell and Lois Caldwell. He studied at the University of South Florida, graduating with a Bachelor of Arts, and then at the General Theological Seminary, graduating with a Master of Divinity in 1978.

Ordained Ministry
Caldwell was ordained deacon in June 1978 and priest in March 1979, by Bishop E. Paul Haynes. He then served as assistant at St John's Church in Tampa, Florida between 1978 and 1984, and then rector of St James' House of Prayer in Tampa between 1984 and 1989. Like his predecessor in Wyoming, Caldwell also spent time in Alaska between 1989 and 1991 serving as rector of St Stephen's Church in Fort Yukon. In 1991, he became rector of St George's Church in Bismarck, North Dakota, where he remained until 1997.

Bishop
On June 7, 1997, during a convention held in St Matthew's Cathedral, Caldwell was elected the eighth Bishop of Wyoming on the forth ballot. He was then consecrated on September 26, 1997, by Bishop James E. Krotz of Nebraska. After retirement from Wyoming in 2010, Caldwell has also served as Assistant Bishop in the Diocese of New York and as interim spiritual leader of St. Mark's Cathedral in Minneapolis, Minnesota. In 2016, Caldwell was called upon to serve as bishop provisional in the Diocese of Lexington after its diocesan bishop, Douglass Hahn, was suspended, and later resigned, as a result of misleading the diocesan search committee. Caldwell served the diocese of Lexington until April 2018.

See also
 List of Episcopal bishops of the United States
 Historical list of the Episcopal bishops of the United States

References

1947 births
Living people
People from Painesville, Ohio
Virginia Theological Seminary alumni
General Theological Seminary alumni
University of South Florida alumni
Episcopal bishops of Lexington
Episcopal bishops of Wyoming